GFI Russia is a Russian video game developer.  It was founded in 1996 as MiST Land South by a group of friends and located in Zelenograd, Moscow. It was purchased in 2003 by Game Factory Interactive and reorganize into GFI Russia in 2006.

MiST Land South was chosen by Game Factory Interactive (GFI) to develop the next two installments in the Jagged Alliance series: Jagged Alliance 3 and Jagged Alliance 3D. The developer MiST Land South hasn't completed the development because of Strategy First (the owners of the Jagged Alliance intellectual property), which had withdrawn the license from GFI.

Games

MiST Land South 
MiST Land South released three strategy games since its inception:
History of Wars: Napoleon (2000)
Paradise Cracked (2002)
The Power of Law (2004)
The Power of Law: Police Stories  (2004)
Alfa: Antiterror (2005)

GFI Russia 
 Gluc'Oza: Action! (2007)
 Hired Guns: The Jagged Edge (2007) (previously titled Jagged Alliance 3D and Jazz: Hired Guns)
 4th Batalion (cancelled in 2007)
 Warfare (2008)

References

External links
 GFI Russia at MobyGames

Video game companies established in 1996
Video game companies of Russia
Zelenograd
1996 establishments in Russia